West Virginia Route 612 is an east–west state highway in Fayette County, West Virginia. The western terminus of the route is at Interstate 64 and Interstate 77 southeast of Mossy. The eastern terminus is at U.S. Route 19 south of Oak Hill.

History
Prior to becoming a state route, the road was known as County Route 61/2.

Major intersections

References

612
Transportation in Fayette County, West Virginia